Musha (from ) is a village  in the Asyut Governorate, Egypt. 

It is  the birthplace of the author and Islamist Sayyid Qutb. The Nicholas S. Hopkins Collection includes photographs of Musha from the 1980s.

References

Populated places in Asyut Governorate